The 1954 Sacramento State Hornets football team represented Sacramento State College—now known as California State University, Sacramento—as a member of the Far Western Conference (FWC) during the 1954 college football season. It was the program's inaugural season of intercollegiate play. Led by first-year head coach Dave Strong, Sacramento State compiled an overall record of 0–7 with a mark of 0–5 in conference play, placing last out of seven teams in the FWC. For the season the team was outscored by its opponents 217 to 40 and was held scoreless in four of the seven games. The Hornets played home games at Charles C. Hughes Stadium in Sacramento, California.

Schedule

Notes

References

Sacramento State
Sacramento State Hornets football seasons
College football winless seasons
Sacramento State Hornets football